Robert "Bobby" Burke (born 5 November 1934) is a Northern Irish former professional footballer who played as an inside forward.

External links
Bobby Burke profile at clarets-mad.co.uk

1934 births
Living people
Association footballers from Northern Ireland
Association football forwards
Burnley F.C. players
Chester City F.C. players
English Football League players
Sportspeople from Ballymena